Neuroscience Letters is a  biweekly rapid-publication scientific journal for short articles covering all aspects of neuroscience. According to the Journal Citation Reports, Neuroscience Letters has a 2020 impact factor of 3.046.

References 

Neuroscience journals
Elsevier academic journals
Publications established in 1975
English-language journals
Biweekly journals